Declan Long is an Irish art critic and lecturer specialising in contemporary art made in ‘Post-Troubles’ Northern Ireland.

Career

Declan Long is programme director of the MA course 'Art in the Contemporary World' at the National College of Art & Design, Dublin, Ireland.

He frequently appears on Arena on RTÉ Radio 1, discussing and reviewing contemporary art. His criticism is regularly published in Artforum, Frieze, and Source Photographic Review. In 2013 Long was a member of the judging panel for the Turner Prize. He is also a board member of the Douglas Hyde Gallery, Dublin.

He has written gallery texts for numerous exhibitions including: Willie Doherty (for Alexander & Bonin, New York and Matt’s Gallery, London, 2012), Isabel Nolan (The Model, Sligo, and Le Musée d'art Moderne de Saint-Etienne, 2011), Jesse Jones (Project Arts Centre, 2011), Mamma Andersson (Douglas Hyde Gallery, 2009), Ulla Von Brandenburg (Irish Museum of Modern Art, 2009), Lothar Hempel (Douglas Hyde Gallery, 2008), William McKeown (Irish Museum of Modern Art, 2008), Fergus Feehily (Neuer Aachener Kunstverein, 2008), Clodagh Emoe, Nina Canell, and Linda Quinlan (for the exhibition 'Come Together' at the Douglas Hyde Gallery, 2007). 

His 2017 book, Ghost-haunted Land: Contemporary Art and Post-troubles Northern Ireland, was described in The Irish Times as "a foundational work of art criticism that will stand alongside Colin Graham’s study of photography and the North as a first point of reference for anyone interested in the Troubles and their cultural legacies."

Bibliography
Long, Declan. Anois. Dublin: Temple Bar Gallery & Studios (2001). 
Long, Declan. Didymosphenia Geminata: Barrie Cooke. Dublin: Kerlin Gallery (2007). 
Long, Declan. Passage. Belfast: Golden Thread Gallery (2007). 
Long, Declan, and Beatrix Ruf. Ulla Von Brandenburg: Whose Beginning is Not, Nor End Cannot be. Dublin: Irish Museum of Modern Art (2008). 
Juncosa, Enrique; Lotz, Corinna; Long, Declan. William McKeown. Milan & Dublin: Charta/Irish Museum of Modern Art (2009). 
Long, Declan. Willie Doherty Photo/text/85/92. London & New York: Matt's Gallery & Alexander and Bonin (2012). 
Murray, Peter; Long, Declan. Mark Clare, I Believe in You. Cork: Crawford Art Gallery (2014). 
Packer, Matt; Long, Declan; Ricks, Jim. Here Comes The Summer. Derry: Centre for Contemporary Art Derry~Londonderry (2017).
 Long, Declan. Ghost-haunted Land: Contemporary Art and Post-troubles Northern Ireland. Manchester: Manchester University (2017). 
 Long, Declan, Kelly Grovier, Rudi Fuchs, and Sean Scully. Sean Scully: Landlines and Other Recent Works. London: Cultureshock Media (2019).

References

Irish art critics
Living people
Academics of the National College of Art and Design
Year of birth missing (living people)